The 2021 Dixie State Trailblazers baseball team represented Dixie State University during the 2021 NCAA Division I baseball season. Dixie State competed in the Western Athletic Conference (WAC). The Trailblazers played their home games at Bruce Hurst Field. Coach Chris Pfatenhauer led Dixie State in his 9th season with the program. The season was Dixie's first as a Division I institution.

Previous season

The Trailblazers finished 15–3 overall, and 4–0 in the Rocky Mountain Athleitc Conference. The season was prematurely cut short due to the COVID-19 pandemic.

Personnel

Roster

Coaching staff

Schedule and results

References

Dixie State Trailblazers
Utah Tech Trailblazers baseball seasons
Dixie State Baseball